"Daytona 500" is the second single by Wu-Tang Clan member Ghostface Killah, featuring Force MDs, Raekwon, and Cappadonna from his 1996 solo debut album Ironman.  The title is taken from the most important and prestigious race on the NASCAR calendar: The Daytona 500.  The song was later added to his greatest hits album, Shaolin's Finest.

Music video
To complement the fast-paced nature of the track, the music video for "Daytona 500" shot from October 1–2, 1996 and is composed of clips from the original anime series Speed Racer. It is also one of the first and earliest anime music videos to be shown on a TV channel, and currently is one of the most popular anime music videos.

Track listing

A Side
Camay (Radio Edit)
Camay (Album Version)
Camay (Instrumental)

B Side
Daytona 500 (Radio Edit)
Daytona 500 (Album Version)
Daytona 500 (Instrumental)

Reception
Q stated that "'Daytona 500' is a magnificent, fast-paced testing of skills with Raekwon and Cappadonna".

Samples
The song contains samples from:

"Nautilus" by Bob James
"Turn the Beat Around" by Vicki Sue Robinson
"Crab Apple" by Idris Muhammad
"Da Mystery of Chessboxin'" by the Wu-Tang Clan
"Incarcerated Scarfaces" & "Ice Water" by Raekwon

References

1996 singles
1996 songs
Ghostface Killah songs
Song recordings produced by RZA
Songs written by Ghostface Killah
Epic Records singles
Songs written by Raekwon
Songs written by Cappadonna
Songs written by RZA
Raekwon songs